The Brompton World Championship is a promotional cycling event for Brompton Bicycle Ltd that has been held in various formats and venues since 2008.

The event consists primarily of a criterium race in which all competitors rode Brompton folding bicycles. The race typically features a Le Mans start with the competitors running to their folded bikes and unfolding them before they could set off around the track. Riders are required to wear business attire instead of standard bicycle clothing.

History 

The first Brompton World Championship, the inspiration of Koos Kroon, Brompton's Spanish distributor, was held on April 8, 2006 in Barcelona, Spain. The second BWC on March 17, 2007, was also in Barcelona. The race relocated to England in 2008 and was held at Blenheim Palace in Oxfordshire.

In 2013 the BWC was merged with the Orbital Festival and moved to the Goodwood Motor Circuit in Chichester, West Sussex.  In 2014 the Orbital Festival was cancelled at late notice but the BWC went ahead at the same venue.

In 2015 the event moved to central London and became part of the Prudential RideLondon cycling festival, taking place annually until 2019.

The 2020 and 2021 events were cancelled due to the COVID-19 pandemic. When RideLondon returned in 2022 the BWC was absent.

A Brompton World Championship race will be held in Singapore in October 2022 as part of the Tour De France Prudential Singapore Criterium.

Basic Rules

All participants in the Brompton World Championship event must wear a suit jacket, collared shirt and tie. Shorts, skirts and three-quarter length trousers may be worn if preferred, though sports attire is not permitted. There are no restrictions regarding footwear. Participants in every event must wear a helmet.
Participants must be 16 years or over (or 12 and over if accompanied by a responsible adult), riding a Brompton and in general good health.
Participants may wear promotional logos or advertising slogans on their clothing on the condition of a pre-payment.  No such advertising is permitted on the bikes.

Brompton World Championship 2013-14 

In 2013 and 2014 the Brompton World Championship took place in the Goodwood Motor Circuit, as part of the wider Orbital Festival cycling exposition.  It features three main events, with separate prizes for the category winners in each event and then the grand prize for the overall victor of the Treble.

800 entrants were expected in 2014.  The Championship consists of a Le Mans style sprint start to the folded bikes before completing 4 laps – over 15 km – of the circuit.  Dress code requires a suit jacket, shirt and tie with trousers/skirts/shorts according to participant preference, with all Lycra and sportswear strictly forbidden.

Prizes are awarded to the three fastest male and female competitors, as well as the male and female Junior (between 12 and 18 years of age) and Veteran (over 50 years of age) winners. Teams of between 3 and 5 members are permitted and are placed according to the aggregated time of the team's top three finishers. There is also a prize awarded to the ‘Best Dressed’ male and female competitors.

Brompton Sprint

Only open to the 200 participants who have registered for the Brompton Treble, the Brompton Sprint consists of a 500m sprint organised in heats of 12 entrants before the final. There is no dress code and prizes are awarded to the fastest male, female, junior and veteran competitors.

Brompton Marathon

The Marathon consists of a 26 km untimed ride through the Sussex countryside, open to 300 participants (compulsory for the Brompton Treble entrants), with food and drink and sightseeing options organised en route. There is no dress code.

Brompton Treble

The 200 participants who compete in all three events are eligible for the Brompton Treble; the male and female competitors with the fastest times from the Sprint and the World Championship, together with successful completion of the Marathon, will be the Brompton Treble Champions.

Brompton National Championships

Since 2010 many countries around the globe have held their own Brompton National Championships featuring comparative events, with the winners invited to participate in the World Championships every summer.

The list of countries that have held National Championships::

 Australia
 Austria
 Chile
 Czech Republic
 Denmark
 France
 Germany
 Italy
 Japan
 Korea
 Mexico
 Portugal
 Spain
 Sweden
 Switzerland
 Taiwan
 USA

Previous Results

2006 Results

Fastest Male 
1- Marti Milla

2- Pau Milla

3- Kilian Palop

Fastest Female 
1-Carolina Paris

2-Irene Rojo

3-Marta Alarcón

TEAM: Cap Problema

2007 Results

Fastest Male 
1- Arnau Rota

2- Pau Milla

3- Marti Milla

Fastest Female 
1-Carolina Paris

2-Maite Mascherpa i Roig

3-Mahrou Raisani

TEAM: Cap Problema

2008 Results

Fastest Male 
1st Alastair Kay
2nd Roberto Heras
3rd Pau Milla

Fastest Female
1st Debbie Lister
2nd Helen Lucas
3rd Jane Bradbury

Fastest Veteran
1st Rob Howells

Fastest Junior
1st Piers Benton

Team Category
1st Cap Problema
2nd Transport for London Tornados
3rd Eunomia 1

Best Dressed
1st David Presly

2009 Results 

Official results as published by Brompton.

Fastest Male
1st Roberto Heras
2nd Michael Hutchinson
3rd Alastair Kay

Fastest Female
1st Julia Shaw
2nd Rachael Elliott
3rd Delia Beddis

Fastest Male Veteran
1st Gary Higton

Fastest Female Veteran
1st Sarah Wookey

Fastest Junior
1st Brock Duncumb Rogers

Team Category
1st Brompton 1
2nd Bike Tech
3rd Cap Problema

Veteran Team Category
Norfolk Enchants

Best Dressed Male
1st Gary Foulger

Best Dressed Female
1st Susie Smith

2010 Results 

Official results as published by Brompton.

Fastest Male	
1st	Philip Liam Curran
2nd	Pau Milla Canals
3rd	Marcel Batlle Giró
	
Fastest Female
1st	Rachael Elliott
2nd	Mercè Pacios
3rd	Charlotte Barnes

Fastest Junior	
1st	Brock Duncomb

Fastest Male Veteran
1st	Richard Trim

Fastest Female Veteran
1st	Sarah Wookey

Best Dressed Male
1st	Ian Harvey

Best Dressed Female
1st	Mary Till

Team Event
1st	Cap Problema 1
2nd	Brompton Factory 1
3rd	BerLon

Veterans	
1st Barnsley Hospice Bromptoneers: Team A

2011 Results 

Official results as published by Brompton.

Fastest Male
1st Michael Hutchinson
2nd Gavin Morton
3rd Aaron Ritz

Fastest Female
1st Rachael Elliott
2nd Julia Shaw
3rd Julie Secor

Fastest Male Veteran
1st Stewart Yates

Fastest Female Veteran
1st Caroline Powell

Fastest Junior
1st Jake Norman

Team Category
1st Brompton Factory 1
2nd Kingston Wheelers
3rd Where's Nigel?

Veteran Team Category
Abromination

Best Dressed Male
1st Fokko Bakker

Best Dressed Female
1st Rachael Jackson

2012 Results 

Official results as published by Brompton.

Fastest Male
1st Michael Hutchinson
2nd Paul Flynn
3rd Gavin Morton

Fastest Female
1st Julia Shaw
2nd Lee Miseon
3rd Isabel Hastie

Fastest Male Veteran
1st Hubert Kivit

Fastest Female Veteran
1st Pauline Warner

Fastest Junior
1st Jake Norman

Team Category
1st Brompton Factory 1
2nd Kingston Wheelers CC
3rd Small Wheels, Big Difference

2013 Results 

Official results as published by Brompton.

Fastest Male
1st Michael Hutchinson

Fastest Female
1st Isabel Hastie

Fastest Male Veteran
1st Anthony Rogers

Fastest Female Veteran
1st Caroline Powell

Fastest Junior
1st Jake Norman

Team Category
1st BBike
2nd Brompton Factory 1
3rd True Wheels/Sleaze Club

2015 Results 
Official results as published by Brompton

Fastest Male
1st  Mark Emsley (GBR)
2nd  Yavor Mitev (GBR)
3rd  Eduardo Gomes (GBR)

Fastest Female
1st  Isabel Hastie(GBR)
2nd  Kim Myojin (KOR)
3rd  Nao Tanaka (JPN)

2016 Results 

Official results as published by Brompton.

Fastest Male
1st Mark Emsley
2nd Richard Spencer
3rd Vojtech Blazejovsky
4th David Mackay

Fastest Female
1st Isabel Hastie
2nd Sarah Phelps
3rd Nao Tanaka
4th Caroline Powell

Fastest Male Veteran
1st Andrea Scavezzon
2nd Nigel Saffery
3rd Peter Hutchinson
4th Adrian Baergi

Fastest Female Veteran
1st Caroline Powell
2nd Giuliana Massarotto
3rd Gina Vaughan
4th Alison Wright

Men's Team Category
1st Brompton Brazing Heritage Team
2nd Joseph Kousac
3rd Team Cadence
4th Brompton Design Racing
Women's Team Category
1st JH Wonder Woman
2nd Green Brompton
Veterans Team Category
1st Abromination

External links 
 Brompton Manufacturer Website
 Prudential Ride London

References 
 Brompton

Cycle races in England
Cycle races in Spain
Brompton bicycle
Recurring sporting events established in 2006
2006 establishments in Spain
Brompton